Council of Four may refer to:

 The Big Four (World War I), the top Allied leaders who met at the Paris Peace Conference in January 1919
 Council of Four (India), a political body of 18th century India
 Council of Four Lands, the central body of Jewish authority in Poland from 1580 to 1764